Thunder Trail is a 1937 American Western film directed by Charles Barton, written by Robert Yost and Stuart Anthony, and starring Gilbert Roland, Charles Bickford, Marsha Hunt, J. Carrol Naish, James Craig and Monte Blue. The film, based on the Zane Grey story Arizona Ames, was released on October 22, 1937, by Paramount Pictures.

Plot
Two brothers are the only survivors of a wagon train robbery, but get separated. Years later they reunite and help get the bandits' leader what he deserves.

Cast  
Gilbert Roland as Arizona Dick Ames
Charles Bickford as Lee Tate
Marsha Hunt as Amy Morgan
J. Carrol Naish as Rafael Lopez
James Craig as Bob Tate
Monte Blue as Jeff Graves
Barlowe Borland as Jim Morgan
Billy Lee as Bob at 8
William Duncan as John Ames
Gene Reynolds as Richard Ames at 14

References

External links 
 

1937 films
1930s English-language films
American Western (genre) films
1937 Western (genre) films
Paramount Pictures films
Films directed by Charles Barton
American black-and-white films
1930s American films